Royal Air Force Church Broughton or more simply RAF Church Broughton is a former Royal Air Force satellite airfield located near Church Broughton, Derbyshire, England.

History

The following units were here at some point:

 Satellite of No. 27 Operational Training Unit RAF (August 1942 - May 1945)
 Sub site for No. 51 Maintenance Unit RAF (August 1945 - ?)
 No. 93 Group Screened Pilots School RAF formed here during May 1943 operating Vickers Wellington III's. The unit was disbanded at RAF Leicester East during October 1944.
 No. 1429 (Czechoslovak Operational Training) Flight RAF using Wellington III's and Westland Lysander II's between August and November 1942. The unit was disbanded on 27 February 1943 while at RAF Thornaby to become Czechoslovak Flight with No. 6 OTU

Current use

The site is currently Dove Valley Park. There are currently 6 turkey rearing sheds on the site. They are positioned on the North Eatern edge of the concrete runway. On the 10th of November 2022 it became the 192nd confirmed location of Avian Flu in the UK in that year.

See also

 List of former Royal Air Force stations

References

Citations

Bibliography

Church Broughton
Military installations closed in the 1940s